Isidoro Caja de la Jara (died 26 May 1593) was a Roman Catholic prelate who served as Bishop of Mondoñedo (1582–1593).

Biography
20 December 1582, Isidoro Caja de la Jara was selected by the King of Spain and confirmed by Pope Gregory XIII as Bishop of Mondoñedo. In 1583, he was consecrated bishop. He served as Bishop of Mondoñedo until his death on 26 May 1593.

References 

1593 deaths
16th-century Roman Catholic bishops in Spain
Bishops appointed by Pope Gregory XIII